Carlos Alberto Berlocq  (born February 3, 1983) is an Argentine retired professional tennis player nicknamed Charly, Panther and Warlocq. His favourite surface was clay and he was last coached by Walter Grinovero. Berlocq's career-high singles ranking was World No. 37, achieved in March 2012.

Career
Berlocq started playing tennis at the age of four and had success on the ATP Futures and Challenger circuits. In 2004, he made six consecutive finals on the Futures circuit and won half of them, two each in Argentina, France and Slovenia. He also made his first Challenger final in Manta, Ecuador, losing to Giovanni Lapentti before winning another Futures title in Argentina.

At the end of 2005, Berlocq finished inside the top 100 for the first time on the back of strong form on the Challenger Tour, where he went 44–20 in singles and won two titles in Turin (defeating Alessio di Mauro) and in Cordenons (defeating Jérôme Haehnel). Berlocq also qualified for his first ATP main event in Stuttgart, losing to Răzvan Sabău. He also played doubles in Bucharest with Mariano Puerta.

Berlocq struggled to adapt his level from the Futures and Challengers to the ATP main level events and achieved only limited success on the ATP Tour. However, his first win was significant. At the ATP Masters Series event in Miami, Berlocq defeated the much-hyped American junior and wildcard entrant Donald Young 6–0, 6–0. Neither player had won a match on the ATP Tour and this win was achieved on a hardcourt, not Berlocq's favoured surface. After defeating Young, Berlocq played another American, James Blake, losing this match 0–6, 0–6 and therefore creating an unusual achievement of winning his first ATP-level match 6–0, 6–0 and then losing by the same scoreline in the next round.

Berlocq won two consecutive matches for the first time on the ATP Tour to make the quarterfinals in Sopot after defeating Philipp Kohlschreiber and Lukáš Dlouhý.

On May 29, 2007, Berlocq upset the No. 30 seed Julien Benneteau in four sets 6–7(5–7), 7–5, 6–2, 6–3 at the 2007 French Open. Berlocq won his first ever grass court match in 's-Hertogenbosch against former World No. 1 Juan Carlos Ferrero in three sets.

2011
At the French Open, he defeated Australian Bernard Tomic 7–5, 6–4, 6–2 in the first round.

Berlocq was taken out by World No. 1 Novak Djokovic in three sets 6–0, 6–0, 6–2 in the second round of the 2011 US Open.

2012

Berlocq started the year in Auckland, losing in the second round to Fernando Verdasco. He made it to the second round of the 2012 Australian Open, where he was defeated by Ivo Karlović.

His best result of the year was in Viña del Mar, where he defeated World No. 25 Juan Ignacio Chela in the semifinals to set up a final appearance against Juan Mónaco, which he lost. He made the quarterfinals in São Paulo, Buenos Aires and Acapulco, losing to World No. 11 Nicolás Almagro, David Nalbandian and Santiago Giraldo respectively. He also made the quarterfinals in Houston, exiting against World No. 15 Feliciano López. He did not have much success at the Masters 1000 events or Grand Slams, exiting in the first or second round of each. In Umag, he fell to World No. 19 Alexandr Dolgopolov in the quarterfinals.

He represented Argentina at the 2012 Summer Olympics, but lost in the first round to Alex Bogomolov of Russia.

At the US Open, he was defeated in the first round by Bernard Tomic in four sets.

2013
He beat Maxime Authom 1–6, 7–6(7–5), 7–6(7–4), 6–2 in the first round of the Australian Open before losing to Kei Nishikori 6–7(4–7), 4–6, 1–6. He lost his first round match at the French Open against 19th seed John Isner in straight sets. Berlocq won his first career title at the Swedish Open, defeating Fernando Verdasco in the final. He lost in the second round of the US Open in straight sets to Roger Federer after winning his first round match against Santiago Giraldo in five sets.

2014
In April, Berlocq won the Portugal Open after defeating Tomáš Berdych in the final.

ATP career finals

Singles: 3 (2 titles, 1 runner-up)

Doubles: 7 (2 titles, 5 runner-ups)

Challenger finals

Singles: 31 (19–12)

Titles

Doubles: 13 (6–7)

Performance timelines

Singles

Doubles

Wins over top 10 players

Notes

References

External links

 
 
 

1983 births
People from Chascomús
Living people
Argentine male tennis players
Argentine people of French descent
Sportspeople from Buenos Aires Province
Tennis players at the 2003 Pan American Games
Tennis players at the 2012 Summer Olympics
Olympic tennis players of Argentina
Pan American Games medalists in tennis
Pan American Games bronze medalists for Argentina
Medalists at the 2003 Pan American Games